Sakhipur is an upazila of Tangail District in the division of Dhaka, Bangladesh.

Administration
Sakhipur Upazila is divided into Sakhipur Municipality and Ten union parishads: Baheratoil, Dariapur, Gazaria, Hatibandha, Jadabpur, Kakrajan, Kalia, and Kalmegha, Borochawna and Hateya Razabari. The union parishads are subdivided into 59 mauzas and 122 villages.

Sakhipur Municipality is subdivided into 9 wards and 18 mahallas.

See also
Upazilas of Bangladesh
Districts of Bangladesh
Divisions of Bangladesh

References

 
Upazilas of Tangail District